Las Meninas is a 1656 painting in the Museo del Prado in Madrid, by Diego Velázquez, the leading artist of the Spanish Golden Age. It has become one of the most widely analyzed works in Western painting, due to the way its complex and enigmatic composition raises questions about reality and illusion, and the uncertain relationship it creates between the viewer and the figures depicted.

The painting is believed by F. J. Sánchez Cantón to depict a room in the Royal Alcazar of Madrid during the reign of King Philip IV of Spain, and presents several figures, most identifiable from the Spanish court, captured in a particular moment as if in a snapshot. Some of the figures look out of the canvas towards the viewer, while others interact among themselves. The five-year-old Infanta Margaret Theresa is surrounded by her entourage of maids of honour, chaperone, bodyguard, two dwarfs and a dog. Just behind them, Velázquez portrays himself working at a large canvas. Velázquez looks outwards, beyond the pictorial space to where a viewer of the painting would stand. In the background there is a mirror that reflects the upper bodies of the king and queen. They appear to be placed outside the picture space in a position similar to that of the viewer, although some scholars have speculated that their image is a reflection from the painting Velázquez is shown working on.

Las Meninas has long been recognised as one of the most important paintings in the history of Western art. The Baroque painter Luca Giordano said that it represents the "theology of painting", and in 1827 the president of the Royal Academy of Arts Sir Thomas Lawrence described the work in a letter to his successor David Wilkie as "the true philosophy of the art". More recently, it has been described as "Velázquez's supreme achievement, a highly self-conscious, calculated demonstration of what painting could achieve, and perhaps the most searching comment ever made on the possibilities of the easel painting".

Background

Court of Philip IV 

In 17th-century Spain, painters rarely enjoyed high social status. Painting was regarded as a craft, not an art such as poetry or music. Nonetheless, Velázquez worked his way up through the ranks of the court of Philip IV, and in February 1651 was appointed palace chamberlain. The post brought him status and material reward, but its duties made heavy demands on his time. During the remaining eight years of his life, he painted only a few works, mostly portraits of the royal family. When he painted Las Meninas, he had been with the royal household for 33 years.

Philip IV's first wife, Elizabeth of France, died in 1644, and their only son, Balthasar Charles, died two years later. Lacking an heir, Philip married Mariana of Austria in 1649, and Margaret Theresa (1651–1673) was their first child, and their only one at the time of the painting. Subsequently, she had a short-lived brother Philip Prospero (1657–1661), and then Charles (1661–1700) arrived, who succeeded to the throne as Charles II at the age of three. Velázquez painted portraits of Mariana and her children, and although Philip himself resisted being portrayed in his old age he did allow Velázquez to include him in Las Meninas. In the early 1650s he gave Velázquez the Pieza Principal of the late Balthasar Charles's living quarters, by then serving as the palace museum, to use as his studio, where Las Meninas is set. Philip had his own chair in the studio and would often sit and watch Velázquez at work. Although constrained by rigid etiquette, the art-loving king seems to have had a close relationship with the painter. After Velázquez's death, Philip wrote "I am crushed" in the margin of a memorandum on the choice of his successor.

During the 1640s and 1650s, Velázquez served as both court painter and curator of Philip IV's expanding collection of European art. He seems to have been given an unusual degree of freedom in the role. He supervised the decoration and interior design of the rooms holding the most valued paintings, adding mirrors, statues and tapestries. He was also responsible for the sourcing, attribution, hanging and inventory of many of the Spanish king's paintings. By the early 1650s, Velázquez was widely respected in Spain as a connoisseur. Much of the collection of the Prado today—including works by Titian, Raphael, and Rubens—were acquired and assembled under Velázquez's curatorship.

Provenance and condition

The painting was referred to in the earliest inventories as La Familia ("The Family"). A detailed description of Las Meninas, which provides the identification of several of the figures, was published by Antonio Palomino ("the Giorgio Vasari of the Spanish Golden Age") in 1724. Examination under infrared light reveals minor , that is, there are traces of earlier working that the artist himself later altered. For example, at first Velázquez's own head inclined to his right rather than his left.

The painting has been cut down on both the left and right sides. It was damaged in the 1734 fire that destroyed the Alcázar, and was restored by court painter Juan García de Miranda (1677–1749). The left cheek of the Infanta was almost completely repainted to compensate for a substantial loss of pigment. After its rescue from the fire, the painting was inventoried as part of the royal collection in 1747–48, and the Infanta was misidentified as Maria Theresa, Margaret Theresa's older half-sister, an error that was repeated when the painting was inventoried at the new Madrid Royal Palace in 1772. A 1794 inventory reverted to a version of the earlier title, The Family of Philip IV, which was repeated in the  records of 1814. The painting entered the collection of the Museo del Prado on its foundation in 1819. In 1843, the Prado catalogue listed the work for the first time as Las Meninas.

In recent years, the picture has suffered a loss of texture and hue. Due to exposure to pollution and crowds of visitors, the once-vivid contrasts between blue and white pigments in the costumes of the meninas have faded. It was last cleaned in 1984 under the supervision of the American conservator John Brealey, to remove a "yellow veil" of dust that had gathered since the previous restoration in the 19th century. The cleaning provoked, according to the art historian Federico Zeri, "furious protests, not because the picture had been damaged in any way, but because it looked different". However, in the opinion of López-Rey, the "restoration was impeccable". Due to its size, importance, and value, the painting is not lent out for exhibition.

Painting materials
A thorough technical investigation including a pigment analysis of Las Meninas was conducted around 1981 in the Museo del Prado. The analysis revealed the usual pigments of the Baroque period frequently used by Velázquez in his other paintings. The main pigments used for this painting were lead white, azurite (for the skirt of the kneeling ), vermilion and red lake, ochres and carbon blacks.

Description

Subject 

Las Meninas is set in Velázquez's studio in Philip IV's  palace in Madrid. The high-ceilinged room is presented, in the words of Silvio Gaggi, as "a simple box that could be divided into a perspective grid with a single vanishing point". In the centre of the foreground stands the Infanta Margaret Theresa (1). The five-year-old infanta, who later married Holy Roman Emperor Leopold I, was at this point Philip and Mariana's only surviving child. To the right of the Infanta are two dwarfs: the achondroplastic German Mari Bárbola (4), and the Italian  (5), who playfully tries to rouse a sleepy mastiff with his foot. The dog is thought to be descended from two mastiffs from Lyme Hall in Cheshire, given to Philip III in 1604 by James I of England. Doña  (6), the princess's chaperone, stands behind them, dressed in mourning and talking to an unidentified bodyguard (or ) (7).

To the rear and at right stands Don José Nieto Velázquez (8)—the queen's chamberlain during the 1650s, and head of the royal tapestry works—who may have been a relative of the artist. Nieto is shown standing but in pause, with his right knee bent and his feet on different steps. As the art critic Harriet Stone observes, it is uncertain whether he is "coming or going". He is rendered in silhouette and appears to hold open a curtain on a short flight of stairs, with an unclear wall or space behind. Both this backlight and the open doorway reveal space behind: in the words of the art historian Analisa Leppanen, they lure "our eyes inescapably into the depths". The royal couple's reflection pushes in the opposite direction, forward into the picture space. The vanishing point of the perspective is in the doorway, as can be shown by extending the line of the meeting of wall and ceiling on the right. Nieto is seen only by the king and queen, who share the viewer's point of view, and not by the figures in the foreground. In the footnotes of Joel Snyder's article, the author recognizes that Nieto is the queen's attendant and was required to be at hand to open and close doors for her. Snyder suggests that Nieto appears in the doorway so that the king and queen might depart.

Velázquez himself (9) is pictured to the left of the scene, looking outward past a large canvas supported by an easel. On his chest is the red cross of the Order of Santiago, which he did not receive until 1659, three years after the painting was completed. According to Palomino, Philip ordered this to be added after Velázquez's death, "and some say that his Majesty himself painted it". From the painter's belt hang the symbolic keys of his court offices.

A mirror on the back wall reflects the upper bodies and heads of two figures identified from other paintings, and by Palomino, as King Philip IV (10) and Queen Mariana (11). The most common assumption is that the reflection shows the couple in the pose they are holding for Velázquez as he paints them, while their daughter watches; and that the painting therefore shows their view of the scene.

Of the nine figures depicted, five are looking directly out at the royal couple or the viewer. Their glances, along with the king and queen's reflection, affirm the royal couple's presence outside the painted space. Alternatively, art historians H. W. Janson and Joel Snyder suggest that the image of the king and queen is a reflection from Velázquez's canvas, the front of which is obscured from the viewer. Other writers say the canvas Velázquez is shown working on is unusually large for one of his portraits, and note that is about the same size as Las Meninas. The painting contains the only known double portrait of the royal couple painted by the artist.

The point of view of the picture is approximately that of the royal couple, though this has been widely debated. Many critics suppose that the scene is viewed by the king and queen as they pose for a double portrait, while the Infanta and her companions are present only to make the process more enjoyable. Ernst Gombrich suggested that the picture might have been the sitters' idea:

 No single theory, however, has found universal agreement. Leo Steinberg suggests that the King and Queen are to the left of the viewer and the reflection in the mirror is that of the canvas, a portrait of the king and queen. 

Clark suggests that the work comprises a scene where the ladies-in-waiting are attempting to cajole the Infanta Doña Margarita to pose with her mother and father. In his 1960 book "Looking at Pictures", Clark writes:

The back wall of the room, which is in shadow, is hung with rows of paintings, including one of a series of scenes from Ovid's Metamorphoses by Rubens, and copies, by Velázquez's son-in-law and principal assistant del Mazo, of works by Jacob Jordaens. The paintings are shown in the exact positions recorded in an inventory taken around this time. The wall to the right is hung with a grid of eight smaller paintings, visible mainly as frames owing to their angle from the viewer. They can be identified from the inventory as more Mazo copies of paintings from the Rubens Ovid series, though only two of the subjects can be seen.

The paintings on the back wall are recognized as representing Minerva Punishing Arachne and Apollo's Victory Over Marsyas. Both stories involve Minerva, the goddess of wisdom and patron of the arts. These two legends are both stories of mortals challenging gods and the dreadful consequences. One scholar points out that the legend dealing with two women, Minerva and Arachne, is on the same side of the mirror as the queen's reflection while the male legend, involving the god Apollo and the satyr Marsyas, is on the side of the king.

Composition 
The painted surface is divided into quarters horizontally and sevenths vertically; this grid is used to organise the elaborate grouping of characters, and was a common device at the time. Velázquez presents nine figures—eleven if the king and queen's reflected images are included—yet they occupy only the lower half of the canvas.

According to López-Rey, the painting has three focal points: the Infanta Margaret Theresa, the self-portrait and the half-length reflected images of King Philip IV and Queen Mariana. In 1960, Clark observed that the success of the composition is a result first and foremost of the accurate handling of light and shade:

However, the focal point of the painting is widely debated. Leo Steinberg argues that the orthogonals in the work are intentionally disguised so that the picture's focal center shifts. Similar to Lopez-Rey, he describes three foci. The man in the doorway, however, is the vanishing point. More specifically, the crook of his arm is where the orthogonals of the windows and lights of the ceiling meet.

Depth and dimension are rendered by the use of linear perspective, by the overlapping of the layers of shapes, and in particular, as stated by Clark, through the use of tone. This compositional element operates within the picture in a number of ways. First, there is the appearance of natural light within the painted room and beyond it. The pictorial space in the midground and foreground is lit from two sources: by thin shafts of light from the open door, and by broad streams coming through the window to the right. The 20th-century French philosopher and cultural critic Michel Foucault observed that the light from the window illuminates both the studio foreground and the unrepresented area in front of it, in which the king, the queen, and the viewer are presumed to be situated. For José Ortega y Gasset, light divides the scene into three distinct parts, with foreground and background planes strongly illuminated, between which a darkened intermediate space includes silhouetted figures.

Velázquez uses this light not only to add volume and definition to each form but also to define the focal points of the painting. As the light streams in from the right it brightly glints on the braid and golden hair of the female dwarf, who is nearest the light source. But because her face is turned from the light, and in shadow, its tonality does not make it a point of particular interest. Similarly, the light glances obliquely on the cheek of the lady-in-waiting near her, but not on her facial features. Much of her lightly coloured dress is dimmed by shadow. The Infanta, however, stands in full illumination, and with her face turned towards the light source, even though her gaze is not. Her face is framed by the pale gossamer of her hair, setting her apart from everything else in the picture. The light models the volumetric geometry of her form, defining the conic nature of a small torso bound rigidly into a corset and stiffened bodice, and the panniered skirt extending around her like an oval candy-box, casting its own deep shadow which, by its sharp contrast with the bright brocade, both emphasises and locates the small figure as the main point of attention.

Velázquez further emphasises the Infanta by his positioning and lighting of her maids of honour, who are set opposite one another: before and behind the Infanta. The maid on the viewer's left is given a brightly lit profile, while her sleeve create a diagonal. Her opposite figure creates a broader but less defined reflection of her attention, making a diagonal space between them, in which their charge stands protected.

A further internal diagonal passes through the space occupied by the Infanta. There is a similar connection between the female dwarf and the figure of Velázquez himself, both of whom look towards the viewer from similar angles, creating a visual tension. The face of Velázquez is dimly lit by light that is reflected, rather than direct. For this reason his features, though not as sharply defined, are more visible than those of the dwarf who is much nearer the light source. This appearance of a total face, full-on to the viewer, draws the attention, and its importance is marked, tonally, by the contrasting frame of dark hair, the light on the hand and brush, and the skilfully placed triangle of light on the artist's sleeve, pointing directly to the face.

The mirror is a perfectly defined unbroken pale rectangle within a broad black rectangle. A clear geometric shape, like a lit face, draws the attention of the viewer more than a broken geometric shape such as the door, or a shadowed or oblique face such as that of the dwarf in the foreground or that of the man in the background. The viewer cannot distinguish the features of the king and queen, but in the opalescent sheen of the mirror's surface, the glowing ovals are plainly turned directly to the viewer. Jonathan Miller pointed out that apart from "adding suggestive gleams at the bevelled edges, the most important way the mirror betrays its identity is by disclosing imagery whose brightness is so inconsistent with the dimness of the surrounding wall that it can only have been borrowed, by reflection, from the strongly illuminated figures of the King and Queen".

As the maids of honour are reflected in each other, so too do the king and queen have their doubles within the painting, in the dimly lit forms of the chaperone and guard, the two who serve and care for their daughter. The positioning of these figures sets up a pattern, one man, a couple, one man, a couple, and while the outer figures are nearer the viewer than the others, they all occupy the same horizontal band on the picture's surface.

Adding to the inner complexities of the picture is the male dwarf in the foreground, whose raised hand echoes the gesture of the figure in the background, while his playful demeanour, and distraction from the central action, are in complete contrast with it. The informality of his pose, his shadowed profile, and his dark hair all serve to make him a mirror image to the kneeling attendant of the Infanta. However, the painter has set him forward of the light streaming through the window, and so minimised the contrast of tone on this foreground figure.

Despite certain spatial ambiguities this is the painter's most thoroughly rendered architectural space, and the only one in which a ceiling is shown. According to López-Rey, in no other composition did Velázquez so dramatically lead the eye to areas beyond the viewer's sight: both the canvas he is seen painting, and the space beyond the frame where the king and queen stand can only be imagined. The bareness of the dark ceiling, the back of Velázquez's canvas, and the strict geometry of framed paintings contrast with the animated, brilliantly lit and sumptuously painted foreground entourage. Stone writes:

According to Kahr, the composition could have been influenced by the traditional Dutch Gallery Pictures such as those by Frans Francken the Younger,  Willem van Haecht, or David Teniers the Younger. Teniers' work was owned by Philip IV and would have been known by Velázquez. Like Las Meninas, they often depict formal visits by important collectors or rulers, a common occurrence,  and "show a room with a series of windows dominating one side wall and paintings hung between the windows as well as on the other walls". Gallery Portraits were also used to glorify the artist as well as royalty or members of the higher classes, as may have been Velázquez's intention with this work.

Mirror and reflection 

The spatial structure and positioning of the mirror's reflection are such that Philip IV and Mariana appear to be standing on the viewer's side of the pictorial space, facing the Infanta and her entourage. According to Janson, not only is the gathering of figures in the foreground for Philip and Mariana's benefit, but the painter's attention is concentrated on the couple, as he appears to be working on their portrait. Although they can only be seen in the mirror reflection, their distant image occupies a central position in the canvas, in terms of social hierarchy as well as composition. As spectators, the viewer's position in relation to the painting is uncertain. It has been debated whether the ruling couple are standing beside the viewer or have replaced the viewer, who sees the scene through their eyes. Lending weight to the latter idea are the gazes of three of the figures—Velázquez, the Infanta, and Maribarbola—who appear to be looking directly at the viewer.

The mirror on the back wall indicates what is not there: the king and queen, and in the words of Harriet Stone, "the generations of spectators who assume the couple's place before the painting". Writing in 1980, the critics Snyder and Cohn observed:

In Las Meninas, the king and queen are supposedly "outside" the painting, yet their reflection in the back wall mirror also places them "inside" the pictorial space.

Snyder proposes it is "a mirror of majesty" or an allusion to the mirror for princes. While it is a literal reflection of the king and queen, Snyder writes "it is the image of exemplary monarchs, a reflection of ideal character". Later he focuses his attention on the princess, writing that Velázquez's portrait is "the painted equivalent of a manual for the education of the princess—a mirror of the princess".

The painting is likely to have been influenced by Jan van Eyck's Arnolfini Portrait, of 1434. At the time, van Eyck's painting hung in Philip's palace, and would have been familiar to Velázquez. The Arnolfini Portrait also has a mirror positioned at the back of the pictorial space, reflecting two figures who would have the same angle of vision as does the viewer of Velázquez's painting; they are too small to identify, but it has been speculated that one may be intended as the artist himself, though he is not shown in the act of painting. According to Lucien Dällenbach:

Jonathan Miller asks: "What are we to make of the blurred features of the royal couple? It is unlikely that it has anything to do with the optical imperfection of the mirror, which would, in reality, have displayed a focused image of the King and Queen". He notes that "in addition to the represented mirror, he teasingly implies an unrepresented one, without which it is difficult to imagine how he could have shown himself painting the picture we now see".

Interpretation 
The elusiveness of Las Meninas, according to Dawson Carr, "suggests that art, and life, are an illusion".  The relationship between illusion and reality were central concerns in Spanish culture during the 17th century, figuring largely in Don Quixote, the best-known work of Spanish Baroque literature. In this respect, Calderón de la Barca's play Life is a Dream is commonly seen as the literary equivalent of Velázquez's painting:

Jon Manchip White notes that the painting can be seen as a résumé of the whole of Velázquez's life and career, as well as a summary of his art to that point. He placed his only confirmed self-portrait in a room in the royal palace surrounded by an assembly of royalty, courtiers, and fine objects that represent his life at court. The art historian Svetlana Alpers suggests that, by portraying the artist at work in the company of royalty and nobility, Velázquez was claiming high status for both the artist and his art, and in particular to propose that painting is a liberal rather than a mechanical art. This distinction was a point of controversy at the time. It would have been significant to Velázquez, since the rules of the Order of Santiago excluded those whose occupations were mechanical. Kahr asserts that this was the best way for Velázquez to show that he was "neither a craftsman or a tradesman, but an official of the court". Furthermore, this was a way to prove himself worthy of acceptance by the royal family.

Michel Foucault devoted the opening chapter of The Order of Things (1966) to an analysis of Las Meninas. Foucault describes the painting in meticulous detail, but in a language that is "neither prescribed by, nor filtered through the various texts of art-historical investigation". Foucault viewed the painting without regard to the subject matter, nor to the artist's biography, technical ability, sources and influences, social context, or relationship with his patrons. Instead he analyzes its conscious artifice, highlighting the complex network of visual relationships between painter, subject-model, and viewer:

For Foucault, Las Meninas illustrates the first signs of a new episteme, or way of thinking. It represents a midpoint between what he sees as the two "great discontinuities" in European thought, the classical and the modern: "Perhaps there exists, in this painting by Velázquez, the representation as it were of Classical representation, and the definition of the space it opens up to us ... representation, freed finally from the relation that was impeding it, can offer itself as representation in its pure form."

Las Meninas as culmination of themes in Velázquez 

Many aspects of Las Meninas relate to earlier works by Velázquez in which he plays with conventions of representation. In the Rokeby Venus—his only surviving nude—the face of the subject is visible, blurred beyond any realism, in a mirror. The angle of the mirror is such that although "often described as looking at herself, [she] is more disconcertingly looking at us". In the early Christ in the House of Martha and Mary of 1618, Christ and his companions are seen only through a serving hatch to a room behind, according to the National Gallery (London), who are clear that this is the intention, although before restoration many art historians regarded this scene as either a painting hanging on the wall in the main scene, or a reflection in a mirror, and the debate has continued. The dress worn in the two scenes also differs: the main scene is in contemporary dress, while the scene with Christ uses conventional iconographic biblical dress.

In Las Hilanderas, believed to have been painted the year after Las Meninas, two different scenes from Ovid are shown: one in contemporary dress in the foreground, and the other partly in antique dress, played before a tapestry on the back wall of a room behind the first. According to the critic Sira Dambe, "aspects of representation and power are addressed in this painting in ways closely connected with their treatment in Las Meninas". In a series of portraits of the late 1630s and 1640s—all now in the Prado—Velázquez painted clowns and other members of the royal household posing as gods, heroes, and philosophers; the intention is certainly partly comic, at least for those in the know, but in a highly ambiguous way.

Velázquez's portraits of the royal family themselves had until then been straightforward, if often unflatteringly direct and highly complex in expression. On the other hand, his royal portraits, designed to be seen across vast palace rooms, feature more strongly than his other works the bravura handling for which he is famous: "Velázquez's handling of paint is exceptionally free, and as one approaches Las Meninas there is a point at which the figures suddenly dissolve into smears and blobs of paint. The long-handled brushes he used enabled him to stand back and judge the total effect."

Influence 

In 1692, the Neapolitan painter Luca Giordano  became one of the few allowed to view paintings held in Philip IV's private apartments, and was greatly impressed by Las Meninas. Giordano described the work as the "theology of painting", and was inspired to paint A Homage to Velázquez (National Gallery, London). By the early 18th century his oeuvre was gaining international recognition, and later in the century British collectors ventured to Spain in search of acquisitions. Since the popularity of Italian art was then at its height among British connoisseurs, they concentrated on paintings that showed obvious Italian influence, largely ignoring others such as Las Meninas.

An almost immediate influence can be seen in the two portraits by Juan Bautista Martínez del Mazo of subjects depicted in Las Meninas, which in some ways reverse the motif of that painting. Ten years later, in 1666, Mazo painted Infanta Margaret Theresa, who was then 15 and just about to leave Madrid to marry the Holy Roman Emperor. In the background are figures in two further receding doorways, one of which was the new King Charles (Margaret Theresa's brother), and another the dwarf Maribarbola. A Mazo portrait of the widowed Queen Mariana again shows, through a doorway in the Alcázar, the young king with dwarfs, possibly including Maribarbola, and attendants who offer him a drink.  Mazo's painting of The Family of the Artist also shows a composition similar to that of Las Meninas.

Francisco Goya etched a print of Las Meninas in 1778, and  used Velázquez's painting as the model for his Charles IV of Spain and His Family. As in Las Meninas, the royal family in Goya's work is apparently visiting the artist's studio. In both paintings the artist is shown working on a canvas, of which only the rear is visible. Goya, however, replaces the atmospheric and warm perspective of Las Meninas with what Pierre Gassier calls a sense of "imminent suffocation". Goya's royal family is presented on a "stage facing the public, while in the shadow of the wings the painter, with a grim smile, points and says: 'Look at them and judge for yourself!' "

The 19th-century British art collector William John Bankes travelled to Spain during the Peninsular War (1808–1814) and acquired a copy of Las Meninas painted by Mazo, which he believed to be an original preparatory oil sketch by Velázquez—although Velázquez did not usually paint studies. Bankes described his purchase as "the glory of my collection", noting that he had been "a long while in treaty for it and was obliged to pay a high price". 

A new appreciation for Velázquez's less Italianate paintings developed after 1819, when Ferdinand VII opened the royal collection to the public. In 1879 John Singer Sargent  painted a small-scale copy of Las Meninas, while his 1882 painting The Daughters of Edward Darley Boit is a homage to Velázquez's panel. The Irish artist Sir John Lavery chose Velázquez's masterpiece as the basis for his portrait The Royal Family at Buckingham Palace, 1913. George V visited Lavery's studio during the execution of the painting, and, perhaps remembering the legend that Philip IV had daubed the cross of the Knights of Santiago on the figure of Velázquez, asked Lavery if he could contribute to the portrait with his own hand. According to Lavery, "Thinking that royal blue might be an appropriate colour, I mixed it on the palette, and taking a brush he [George V] applied it to the Garter ribbon."

Between August and December 1957, Pablo Picasso painted a series of 58 interpretations of Las Meninas, and figures from it, which currently fill the Las Meninas room of the Museu Picasso in Barcelona, Spain. Picasso did not vary the characters within the series, but largely retained the naturalness of the scene; according to the museum, his works constitute an "exhaustive study of form, rhythm, colour and movement". A print of 1973 by Richard Hamilton called Picasso's Meninas draws on both Velázquez and Picasso. Photographer Joel-Peter Witkin was commissioned by the Spanish Ministry of Culture  to create a work titled Las Meninas, New Mexico (1987) which references Velázquez's painting as well as other works by Spanish artists.

In 2004, the video artist Eve Sussman filmed 89 Seconds at Alcázar, a high-definition video tableau inspired by Las Meninas. The work is a recreation of the moments leading up to and directly following the approximately 89 seconds when the royal family and their courtiers would have come together in the exact configuration of Velázquez's painting. Sussman had assembled a team of 35, including an architect, a set designer, a choreographer, a costume designer, actors, and a film crew.

A 2008 exhibition at the Museu Picasso called "Forgetting Velázquez: Las Meninas" included art responding to Velázquez's painting by Fermín Aguayo, Avigdor Arikha, Claudio Bravo, Juan Carreño de Miranda, Michael Craig-Martin, Salvador Dalí, Juan Downey, Goya, Hamilton, Mazo, Vik Muniz, Jorge Oteiza, Picasso, Antonio Saura, Franz von Stuck, Sussman, Manolo Valdés, and Witkin, among others. In 2009 the Museo del Prado published online photographs of Las Meninas in at a resolution of 14,000 megapixels.

Notes

References

Sources

Further reading

 Arasse, Daniel. "The Eye of the Master: Las Meninas, Velázquez," in Take a Closer Look, translated from the French by Alyson Waters. Princeton, New Jersey, and Oxford, U.K.: Princeton University Press, 2013. .
 Brooke, Xanthe. "A Masterpiece in Waiting: The Response to Las Meninas in Nineteenth-Century Britain," one of seven essays in Stratton-Pruitt, Suzanne L., ed. Velázquez's 'Las Meninas'''. Cambridge: Cambridge University Press, 2003. . 
 Brown, Jonathan. "On the Meaning of Las Meninas," in Images and Ideas in Seventeenth-Century Spanish Painting. Princeton, New Jersey: Princeton University Press, 1978.  . 
 Cumming, Laura. "Velázquez," in A Face to the World: On Self-Portraits, London: HarperPress, 2009. .
 Liess, Reinhard. Im Spiegel der Meninas. Velásquez über sich und Rubens. Goettingen: V&Runipress, 2003, 
 Searle, John R. "Las Meninas and the Paradoxes of Pictorial Representation". Critical Inquiry 6 (Spring 1980).

 External links 

 La Kabala y Las Meninas  
 Las Meninas at the Electronic Visualization Lab at the University of Illinois at Chicago 
 Educational audio tour of Las Meninas
 Velázquez , exhibition catalog from The Metropolitan Museum of Art, which contains material on Las Meninas'' (see index)

1656 paintings
Dogs in art
Group portraits by Spanish artists
Mirrors in art
Paintings about painting
Paintings of children
Portraits by Diego Velázquez in the Museo del Prado
Portraits of Philip IV of Spain by Diego Velázquez
Self-portraits
Works about dwarfism